Scholars Sing Cayabyab is a compilation album of Ryan Cayabyab-composed songs performed by the Pinoy Dream Academy Season 2 Top 10 scholars and the PDA Season 1 Grand Star Dreamer Yeng Constantino. The album was released on 2008 under Star Records.

The album is composed of eleven tracks that includes the songs "Paano Na Kaya", "Manalig Ka", "Limang Dipang Tao" and "Awit Ng Pangarap".

Track listing 
 "Paano Na Kaya" - Bugoy Drilon
 "Manalig Ka" - Laarni Lozada
 "Another Goodbye Song" - Van Roxas
 "I'd Rather" - Liezel Garcia
 "Hero" - Miguel Mendoza
 "Limang Dipang Tao" - Apple Abarquez
 "Ganun Ba" - Iñaki Ting
 "Bakit Ganyan" - Cris Pastor
 "Wala Kang Katulad" - Sen Nichols
 "Narito Lang Ako" - Bunny Malunda
 "Awit Ng Pangarap" - Yeng Constantino

References

Compilation albums by Filipino artists
2008 compilation albums
Pop compilation albums
Rhythm and blues compilation albums
Star Music compilation albums
Tagalog-language compilation albums